Hindustan National Glass & Industries Limited  (HNGIL) is an Indian container glassmaker based in Kolkata. The company is the largest and one of the oldest glass manufacturing companies in India.

History
Hindustan National Glass & Industries Limited is engaged in manufacturing and selling of container glass  The company was originally incorporated on 23 February, under the name of "Hindustan National Glass Manufacturing Company Limited". On 22 November 1971 the name was changed to the present one. In 2018, it is reported to have barely escaped bankruptcy.

Products 
The company manufactures containers for pharmaceuticals, liquor, beer, beverages, cosmetics and processed food.

References

External links 
 Company website

Indian brands
Glassmaking companies of India
Manufacturing companies based in Kolkata
Indian companies established in 1946
Manufacturing companies established in 1946
Companies listed on the Bombay Stock Exchange